Te Ahu Trevor Davis (born 9 December 1985 in Auckland) is a New Zealand cricketer who played in the Under-19 Cricket World Cup in 2004. He is a right-handed batsman and right arm fast-medium bowler who plays his domestic cricket for Northern Districts. Davis made his first-class debut in 2004–05 against Otago, trapping Mohammad Wasim lbw to claim his first wicket at that level.

References
 Statistical summary from CricketArchive

1985 births
Living people
New Zealand cricketers
Northern Districts cricketers